Fio is an Eastern Beboid language of Cameroon.

References

See also
 List of endangered languages in Africa

Beboid languages
Languages of Cameroon